The Salvation Army, Twickenham is a Salvation Army church on May Road, Twickenham
TW2 6QW in the London Borough of Richmond upon Thames. Its facilities include a  community centre, part-funded by a housing association, Thames Valley Housing (TVH); the centre  opened in 2014.

References

External links
Official website

Churches in Twickenham
Twickenham
Salvationism in England